Portrait of an Artist or Portrait of the Artist may refer to:

Painting
Portrait of the Artist (Mary Cassatt), 1878 painting by Mary Cassatt
Portrait of an Artist (Pool with Two Figures), 1972 painting by David Hockney

Literature
Portrait of an Artist, as an Old Man, 2000 novel by Joseph Heller
A Portrait of the Artist as a Young Man, 1916 novel by James Joyce

Music
Portrait of the Artist (album), 1969 album by Bob Brookmeyer
Portrait of an Artist (album), 1982 album by Joe Albany
Astoria: Portrait of the Artist, 1990 album by Tony Bennett

Film
Annigoni: Portrait of an Artist, 1995 documentary film
Portrait of the Artist (film), 2014 French film
Portrait of the Artist as a Young Bunny, 1980 American film